Grégory Habeaux (born 20 October 1982 in Bassenge) is a Belgian former cyclist, who rode professionally between 2005 and 2018 for the , ,  and  teams before retiring due to heart issues.

Major results

2004
 2nd Overall Tour de Liège
1st Stage 1
 5th La Côte Picarde
 5th Grand Prix Criquielion
 7th Memorial Van Coningsloo
2006
 8th Omloop van het Waasland
2010
 2nd Overall Boucles de la Mayenne
 4th Overall Ronde de l'Oise
 10th Polynormande
2011
 1st Dwars door het Hageland
 8th Antwerpse Havenpijl
2012
 7th Overall Paris–Corrèze
2013
 9th Memorial Marco Pantani
2014
 4th Overall La Tropicale Amissa Bongo
2015
 1st  Mountains classification Tour de l'Eurométropole
 3rd Velothon Wales
 8th Overall Paris–Arras Tour
 10th Polynormande
2016
 3rd Internationale Wielertrofee Jong Maar Moedig
 7th Circuit de Wallonie
 10th Classic Loire Atlantique
2017
 2nd Paris–Chauny
 10th Grand Prix de la ville de Nogent-sur-Oise

References

External links

1982 births
Living people
Belgian male cyclists
People from Bassenge
Cyclists from Liège Province